Cecoy Robinson (born 10 October 1987) is a Bermudian footballer who plays for PHC Zebras and the Bermuda national team.

References

1987 births
Living people
Bermudian footballers
Association football forwards
Bermuda international footballers
2019 CONCACAF Gold Cup players
Bermuda under-20 international footballers
PHC Zebras players